In information theory, the graph entropy is a measure of the information rate achievable by communicating symbols over a channel in which certain pairs of values may be confused. This measure, first introduced by Körner in the 1970s, has since also proven itself useful in other settings, including combinatorics.

Definition
Let  be an undirected graph.

Properties
 Monotonicity.
 Subadditivity.
 Arithmetic mean of disjoint unions. Let  be a sequence of graphs on disjoint sets of vertices, with  vertices, respectively. Then .

Additionally, simple formulas exist for certain families classes of graphs.
 Complete balanced k-partite graphs have entropy . In particular, 
 Edge-less graphs have entropy .
 Complete graphs on  vertices have entropy .
 Complete balanced bipartite graphs have entropy .

Example
Here, we use properties of graph entropy to provide a simple proof that a complete graph  on  vertices cannot be expressed as the union of fewer than  bipartite graphs.

Now let  be a complete graph on  vertices. By the properties listed above, .

General References

Notes

Information theory
Graph theory